European Waterways is an international company based in Berkshire, England that operates a fleet of 17 river cruising vessels along the rivers and canals of Europe. The company takes old trading barges and converts them into hotel barges.

Company history
European Waterways, a UK company based in England, was established in 1977 by owner Derek Banks with the purchase of an existing French inland waterways cruising company which had been created 3 years earlier in 1974. The first hotel barge was Anjodi, which was originally purchased in 1982. In 1994 the company built the 12 passenger La Belle Epoque followed by its sister ship, 12 passenger L'Impressionniste, in 1995. After these acquisitions European Waterways expanded steadily and, as a result of cooperation with several companies in the travel industry and additional acquisitions, now operates a fleet of 17 hotel barges along the inland waterways of 9 countries in Europe.

Banks, the company founder, was brought up on the River Thames and has enjoyed all aspects of life afloat. It was as a result of this early exposure to the inland waterways that he was inspired to move to a lock house in the middle of France in the mid 1970s and start a barge cruising company.

The company originally focused on the Canal du Nivernais in central Burgundy, France, but as of 2018 operates throughout Europe.

Current fleet

References

External links
Official website

Cruise lines
River cruise companies
Privately held companies of the United Kingdom
Transport companies established in 1977
Shipping companies of the United Kingdom